Loxorhynchus is a genus of crabs of the eastern Pacific Ocean in the family Epialtidae.

Species
 Loxorhynchus crispatus Stimpson, 1857  — masking crab or moss crab
 Loxorhynchus grandis Stimpson, 1857   — sheep crab
 Loxorhynchus guinotae Hendrickx & Cervantes, 2003

References

.

Majoidea
Crustaceans of the eastern Pacific Ocean
Taxa named by William Stimpson